Leishan (Hmu language:Zangx Xongx) is a county in the east of Guizhou province, China. It is under the administration of the Qiandongnan Miao and Dong Autonomous Prefecture. More than 90% of population are ethnic Hmu (Miao subgroup).

Climate

Attractions

Thousand Households 
Miao Stockade Village of Thousand Households in Xijiang Town is a famous scenic spot in China.

Langde Miao Village 
Langde Miao Village(朗德苗寨), generally refers to Langde Shang Miao Village, belongs to Leishan County, Qiandongnan Miao and Dong Autonomous Prefecture, Guizhou Province. It is a Miao village with hundreds of families. The ancient buildings of Langde Miao Village are announced as the fifth batch of key cultural relics protection units in China.

References 

 
County-level divisions of Guizhou
Counties of Qiandongnan Prefecture